The 2010–11 North Sea Cup was the inaugural season of the North Sea Cup, which succeeded the Dutch Eredivisie as the highest level of ice hockey competition in the Netherlands.  Two former Belgian Elite Series teams, HYC Herentals and White Caps Turnhout, participated with the six remaining teams of the Dutch Eredivisie after Amstel Tijgers and Groningen Grizzlies dropped out before the season began and the new Zoetermeer Panthers team dropped out at the beginning of the season.

The 8-team, 28-game regular season ended with HYS The Hague finishing first overall, while the two Belgian teams struggled initially and finished seventh and eighth.  The six Dutch teams participated in the Dutch National Championships with HYS The Hague 
winning the championship over Tilburg Trappers.  The two Belgian teams, as the only teams playing in the top league sanctioned by the Royal Belgian Ice Hockey Federation, played their own series against each other to determine the Belgian champion, with Turnhout beating Herentals.

Regular season

References

External links
 Results at official website

North Sea Cup
2
2010–11 in Belgian ice hockey
2010–11 in Dutch ice hockey